The Toro Rosso STR2 is the car with which the Scuderia Toro Rosso team competed in the  Formula One season. It was unveiled on 13 February 2007 at the Circuit de Catalunya. The car is, controversially, a variant of the Red Bull RB3 chassis (although powered by a Ferrari instead of a Renault engine). It was initially driven by Vitantonio Liuzzi and Scott Speed, until Speed was replaced by Sebastian Vettel at the Hungaroring for the remainder of the season. The car in a modified form was also used to compete in the first four races of the  Formula One season. The modified car was driven by Sébastien Bourdais, four-consecutive-time Champ Car winner, and Vettel. The STR2 was the first-ever Toro Rosso F1 car to use the mandatory 90-degree Formula One V8 engine configuration but Toro Rosso opted for the 2006-spec Ferrari 056 instead of the 2007-spec because of 1-year old Toro Rosso engine policy and as a cost-saving measure.

Customer car protests 
Spyker and Williams before and throughout the season repeatedly stated their belief that the STR2 is in fact identical to the Red Bull RB3. Central to their objection was their belief that the Concorde Agreement clearly requires all teams to construct their own individual chassis. Both teams threatened legal action over the possible breach of regulations, particularly Colin Kolles, the Spyker team principal.

Launch 

The car was launched in a low key event on a test day at the Circuit de Catalunya on 13 February 2007, and immediately attracted the expected controversy when photos were released. There was a pre-event fear of the car not being ready but work through the previous night by the mechanics ensured that it was unveiled on time. Liuzzi was confirmed as one of the team's drivers at the launch but the announcement of his teammate was delayed due to 'contractual issues'. Scott Speed, who partnered Liuzzi at the team in 2006, was believed to be the most likely choice, and his re-appointment was later confirmed. The car itself was, as explained, a development version of Red Bull Racing's RB3. The Red Bull RB3 was designed by Adrian Newey, who earned a reputation as one of the most successful F1 designers with Championship-winning cars at both Williams and McLaren. In order for Red Bull Racing and Toro Rosso to use the chassis, Newey was employed by 'new' consortium named Red Bull Technology. This provided a loop-hole for STR around the prohibition of chassis sharing, as both teams were legally using a car developed by an 'independent' third party. Team Principal Franz Tost commented at the launch that "We are quite optimistic, I think we can make a step forward with the new car and the new engine. We have one very experienced driver and the second we will see [...] Therefore it is becoming better and better and we expect a quite successful season."

STR2 & STR2B Development

2007 STR2 Car Development 

Generally the STR2 and RB3 received aerodynamic revisions at different stages through the season. The STR2 was fitted with a new front wing in Monaco, similar to the one that sister team Red Bull implemented in the previous round, with 2 curved upper profiles that improve airflow over the car and increase downforce. The team further developed the STR2 in Turkey with a new barge board development. The STR2 was fitted with a "arch" over the nose on the front wing around the Italian Grand Prix, the Red Bull RB3s did not sport such a wing design until around the Japanese Grand Prix.

2008 STR2B Car Development 

The STR2 was developed further to include the new McLaren Electronic Systems "Standardised Electronic Control Unit" that prevented the cars having electronic driver aids like engine braking and traction control. The car was also adapted for the new rules on driver safety with higher headrests around the cockpit. Another development was a new gearbox, as the 2008 rules stated that cars must have a gearbox that lasts for four races: if one failed, the driver faced a penalty of five places on the starting grid.

The STR2B underwent a total re-working of the front suspension at the Barcelona test on 1–3 February, This was to make better use of the Bridgestone Potenza tyres, but also to clean up the area from the front wing to under the drivers seat, improving the efficiency of the rear diffuser, thus providing more grip.

Competition history

2007 season 

The team's results during the season were generally poor compared to its rivals. For the first half of the season, the STR2 did not reach the level of competitiveness expected, especially when compared to the 'sister' Red Bull Racing team. The car's main weakness, which it shared with the RB3, was the new seamless shift gearbox, which frequently failed during races. Results did pick up slightly in the second half of the season, as both Red Bull Racing and Toro Rosso started to find more reliability with the car. A double points finish in China, with Vettel fourth and Liuzzi sixth, gave the team a total of eight world championship points. This gave Toro Rosso a 7th-place finish in the Constructors' Standings after the disqualification of McLaren.

2008 season 

The STR2Bs of Vettel and Bourdais failed to finish the 2008 Australian Grand Prix. Bourdais scored points, however, as he was classified in seventh position, albeit that while he did not finish the race he had completed 90% of the race distance. However, at the 2008 Malaysian Grand Prix both cars failed to score any points; Bourdais spun off in the first lap and Vettel retired with an engine failure. Bourdais finished 15th at the 2008 Bahrain Grand Prix, while Vettel retired on the first lap with engine failure.

Coming back to Europe for the start of the European season, the team hoped that the STR2B would have its last race at the 2008 Spanish Grand Prix, with the STR3 being raced for the first time at the 2008 Turkish Grand Prix. The new car's debut was later delayed until the 2008 Monaco Grand Prix, as Chief Engineer Laurent Mekies said they didn't have enough parts to run the team in a professional manner over the weekend of the Turkish Grand Prix.

At the 2008 Spanish Grand Prix, both drivers again failed to finish the race, after they were involved in separate collisions in the opening laps; Force India driver Adrian Sutil hit Vettel on lap one, while Bourdais collided with Nelson Piquet Jr. on the second lap. Bourdais retired on the seventh lap due to suspension damage sustained in this coming together. Fortunes did not improve during the following round in Turkey, where Bourdais span off the track and Vettel finished in 17th, and last, position after suffering a puncture in the opening laps.

Complete Formula One results
(key)

* Only 2 points scored using the STR2B.

† Did not finish the race but was classified as they completed more than 90% of the race distance.

External links 

 STR 2 Official Tech Specs
 Tech Specs on F1Technical.net

References 

Toro Rosso Formula One cars
2007 Formula One season cars
2008 Formula One season cars